Thottuva is a village in Ernakulam District, Kerala, India. It lies on the banks of Periyar River near Kalady. The name Thottuva in  Malayalam means "Mouth of the stream". Just as the name suggests, there is a small stream in the village, which joins the mightier Periyar river here. 

The nearest railway station is Angamali (also 15 km).

Location

Landmarks
Thottuva Dhanwanthari temple
St.Joseph's Church

Notes
Near to international pilgrim center Malayattoor Kurisumudi,
Near to Sree Shankaracharya temple,
Near to Kodanadu Anakkoodu,
Near to tourist spot Kaprikkadu.

References

1.http://www.naturemagics.com/kerala-temples/thottuva-dhanwanthiri-temple.shtm

Villages in Ernakulam district